David Vann was born October 19, 1966 on Adak Island in the Aleutian Islands, Alaska.  He is a novelist and short story writer, and is currently a professor of creative writing at the University of Warwick in England. Vann received a Guggenheim Fellowship and has been a National Endowment of the Arts fellow, a Wallace Stegner fellow, and a John L’Heureux fellow.  His work has appeared in many magazines and newspapers. His books have been published in 23 languages and have won 14 prizes and been on 83 'best books of the year' lists. They have been selected for the New Yorker Book Club, the Times Book Club, the Samlerens Bogklub in Denmark and have been optioned for film by Inkfactory and Haut et Court. He has appeared in documentaries with the BBC, CNN, PBS, National Geographic, and E! Entertainment.

Works
 2005 — A Mile Down: The True Story of a Disastrous Career at Sea
 2008 — Legend of a Suicide, stories and a novella
 2011 — Caribou Island
 2011 — Last Day On Earth: A Portrait of the NIU School Shooter
 2012 — Dirt
 2013 — Goat Mountain
 2014 — Crocodile: Memoirs from a Mexican Drug-Running Port, published in Spanish only
 2015 — Aquarium
 2017 — Bright Air Black
2019 — Halibut on the Moon

Prizes 
 2007 — Grace Paley Prize for Short Fiction for Legend of a Suicide/Sukkwan Island
 2008 — California Book Award for Legend of a Suicide/Sukkwan Island
 2009 — AWP Nonfiction Award for Last Day on Earth: A Portrait of the NIU School Shooter
 2010 — Prix Medicis Étranger (best foreign novel), France, for Legend of a Suicide/Sukkwan Island
 2010 — Le Prix des Lecteurs de L’Express, France, for Legend of a Suicide/Sukkwan Island
 2011 — Premi Llibreter, Spain, best foreign novel for Legend of a Suicide/Sukkwan Island
 2013 — St. Francis College Literary Prize for Dirt
 Henfield/Transatlantic Review Award for Legend of a Suicide/Sukkwan Island
 2010 — Le Prix des Lecteurs de la Maison du Livre de Rodez for Legend of a Suicide
 2011 — Prix du Marais (regional public library prize in France) for Legend of a Suicide
 2011 — Le Prix de la librairie Nouvelle de Voiron for Caribou Island
 1st place in Fish Stories Best Fiction Contest for Legend of a Suicide
 1st prize winner of River City Writing Awards for Legend of a Suicide
 Le Prix de la Médiathèque de Saint-Genis-les-Ollières for Legend of a Suicide

Prize Lists

Finalist 
2nd place Pirate’s Alley Faulkner Society Prize for the novel for Legend of a Suicide

2011 — Flaherty-Dunnan First Novel Prize, The Center for Fiction, New York for Caribou Island

2011 — Prix du Roman Fnac, France, second place for Caribou Island

2011 — Le Prix Lire & Virgin, France, for Caribou Island

2012 — PEN CENTER USA Literary Awards finalist in Creative Nonfiction for Last Day On Earth

2012 — The Sunday Times Short Story Award shortlist (final 5 out of 1,150), for a short story, “It’s Not Yours”

2013 — Prix du Festival Lire en Poche de Gradignan, for Caribou Island

2013 — Finalist, Grand prix de Littérature policière, France, for Dirt

2013 — Finalist, California Book Award in Fiction for Goat Mountain

Longlisted 
2008 — The Story Prize, for Legend of a Suicide

2013 — International IMPAC Dublin Literary Award for Caribou Island

2013 — Chautauqua Prize, for Goat Mountain

2014 — International IMPAC Dublin Literary Award for Dirt

Two Pushcart Prize nominations for Legend of a Suicide

References

External links

Author Website
 KGNU Claudia Cragg radio interview with David Vann on 'Caribou Island'

1966 births
Living people
Writers from Alaska
American short story writers
American academics of English literature
Stanford University alumni
University of San Francisco alumni
Prix Médicis étranger winners
St. Francis College Literary Prize
Stegner Fellows
People from Aleutians West Census Area, Alaska